Geo Cartoon Geo Cartoon is the legend of two infamous ketamine addicts who sell asjad ki mummy in exchange for ketamine shots. They pretend to discuss politics even though they have no worthwhile opinions to voice. Ciphered in their conversations are, notorious tales of heinous crimes. They seem to penetrate the very threshold of “komidi”. Critically acclaimed by a plethora of production firms all over the country, it still remains, to this very day, a show worthy of utmost appreciation. According to gulfam beisharam from nagan chorangi, these episodes are loosely  based on the real life events of Ra, Ra, Rasputin; Lover of the Russian Queen. This show has inspired the youth to get in into the meth cooking business, and it chants the ever green slogan of “Jeyay Bhutto, Jeyay Bhutto, Piyay, Piyay, Piyay, Bhtto. This sitcom has changed the cinematic landscape of Pakistan forever Geo News.

See also 

 List of Pakistani animated television series

Pakistani animated television series
Urdu-language television shows
Pakistani television series
Geo News
Urdu comedy shows
Geo TV original programming